The Beautiful Gambler is a 1921 silent Western film directed by William Worthington and starring Grace Darmond, Jack Mower, and Harry von Meter. It is not known whether the film currently survives.

Plot 
Molly Hanlon marries a villainous and professional gambler after her father gets into a lot of debt from gambling. One day, the saloon she is at catches on fire, but she is saved by Miles Rand.  Both Hanlon and Rand assume that the gambler has perished, and move to New York. However, it is revealed that the gambler is not dead, and he tracks the two down to kill them in revenge. He is unsuccessful. and Rand kills him, but authorities unaware of the circumstances arrest him and have him convicted of murder. One of the gambler's associates explains the situation to authorities, and Rand is freed. The film ends with Hanlon and Rand being free to marry.

Cast
 Grace Darmond as Molly Hanlon
 Jack Mower as Miles Rand
 Harry von Meter as Lee Kirk
 Charles Brinley as Jim Devlin
 Herschel Mayall as Judge Rand
 Willis Marks as Mark Hanlon

References

External links
 

1921 films
1921 Western (genre) films
Silent American Western (genre) films
American black-and-white films
American silent feature films
Films directed by William Worthington
Universal Pictures films
1920s American films